Wolfgang Amadeus Mozart's String Quartet No. 2 in D major, K. 155/134a, is thought to have been composed in the autumn of 1772 in Bolzano, while Mozart and his father were touring Italy. The opening movement is notable for its unusual (at the time) key changes and its use of the interrupted Cadence.

Movements
The quartet has three movements:
Allegro
Andante in A major
Molto Allegro

References

External links 
 
 

1
1772 compositions
Compositions in D major